Gerson Levi Mayen Villavicencio (born 9 February 1989) is a professional footballer who plays as a midfielder for Primera División club Águila. Born in the United States, he represents the El Salvador national team at international level.

Career

Youth
Mayen attended Manual Arts High School, and started playing soccer when he was young with a club named Gilbert Lindsay Youth Soccer Club, then with the club soccer with Alta Loma Arsenal where he won four Cal South State Cups, four Regional Championships and three National Championships.  Mayen also won two Golden Boot awards.  Rather than opting to play collegiate soccer, Mayen joined the Chivas USA U-18 team.

Professional
Mayen was signed to a full professional contract by Chivas USA on 27 March 2008, after training with the club throughout preseason. He did not make an appearance with the first team in his rookie season, but made 12 appearances in the MLS Reserve Division, playing primarily as a defender and defensive midfielder. He made his professional debut on 29 March 2009, in Chivas's game against FC Dallas.

On 6 August 2010, Chivas USA sent Mayen, along with teammate Chukwudi Chijindu, on loan to USSF Division 2 Professional League side Miami FC. Mayen returned to Florida in July 2011 when he was loaned to NASL club Fort Lauderdale Strikers.

Mayen was traded with Justin Braun to MLS expansion side Montreal Impact for James Riley and allocation money on 23 November 2011. However, Mayen was waived by Montreal on 1 March, prior to the start of the 2012 season.

International

United States
Mayen has made one appearance for the United States U-20 men's national soccer team, in the Campos Verdes International Tournament in Portugal in 2008. Mayen was also named to the 2009 Under 20 World Cup in Egypt where he started and played 90 minutes against Germany.

El Salvador
On July 5, 2011, Mayen was given permission by the FIFA to be part of the El Salvador team. "After a thorough review of the documentation submitted by the Salvadoran Football Federation, the judge concluded that the player Gerson Mayen Villavicencio meets the objective conditions stipulated in Article 18, paragraph 1 of the Regulations Applicable Statutory of the FIFA: in particular, the player Gerson Mayen has never played an international "A" match in an official competition representing the U.S. Soccer Federation," reads the resolution of FIFA.
Mayen made his international début at the 2013 Copa Centroamericana, coming on as substitute at the 86' minute in El Salvador 1–1 draw with Honduras.

Statistics

International goals
Scores and results list El Salvador's goal tally first.

Honours
 Santa Tecla
 Primera División (1): Clausura 2015, Apertura 2016

References

External links
 
 
 

1989 births
Living people
American soccer players
Salvadoran footballers
Chivas USA players
Miami FC (2006) players
Fort Lauderdale Strikers players
LA Laguna FC players
C.D. FAS footballers
Santa Tecla F.C. footballers
American sportspeople of Salvadoran descent
Citizens of El Salvador through descent
Major League Soccer players
USSF Division 2 Professional League players
North American Soccer League players
USL League Two players
United States men's under-20 international soccer players
El Salvador international footballers
2013 Copa Centroamericana players
2013 CONCACAF Gold Cup players
2017 Copa Centroamericana players
2017 CONCACAF Gold Cup players
Soccer players from California
Salvadoran expatriate footballers
Association football midfielders
2019 CONCACAF Gold Cup players
Homegrown Players (MLS)